Malmquist is a Swedish surname, which means "ore-branch". Alternative spellings include Malmqvist and Malmkvist. The name may refer to:

Axel Johannes Malmquist (1882–1952), Swedish mathematician
Göran Malmqvist (1924–2019), Swedish linguist
Gunnar Malmquist (1893–1982), Swedish astronomer
Linus Malmqvist (born 1981), Swedish football player
Robin Malmkvist (born 1987), Swedish football player
Siw Malmkvist (born 1936), Swedish singer
Sten Malmquist (1917–2004), Swedish economist
Tom Malmquist (born 1978), Swedish writer
Walter Malmquist (born 1956), American skier
Camilla Malmquist Harket (born 1963), Swedish Model and Actress

Other uses
1527 Malmquista, a main-belt asteroid
Malmquist bias, in observational astronomy
Malmquist index, to compare the production technology of two economies
Malmquist's theorem in differential equations

Swedish-language surnames